Established in 1988, Macleay College is an Australian accredited higher education provider located in Chippendale, New South Wales. It offers two-year Bachelor degrees in advertising and media, digital media, journalism and business; and one-year Diploma courses in journalism, advertising and media, digital media, marketing and business management, with specialisations available in event management, entrepreneurship, real estate, public relations, travel and tourism or sports business.

In 2015 Macleay opened a Melbourne campus located at Swanston Street in the Melbourne CBD.

Since its founding Macleay College has been a family owned business, transferring ownership to Sarah Stavrow in 2021.

Courses
Diploma of Journalism
Diploma of Advertising & Media
Diploma of Digital Media
Diploma of Marketing 
Diploma of Marketing (Real Estate)
Diploma of Business Management (Sports Business)
Diploma of Business Management (Entrepreneurship)
Diploma of Business Management (Event Management)
Diploma of Business Management (Travel & Tourism)
Diploma of Business Management (Public Relations)
Bachelor of Journalism
Bachelor of Advertising & Media
Bachelor of Digital Media
Bachelor of Business

Academics
Teaching staff include Tracey Holmes.

Alumni
 Yalda Hakim, broadcast journalist
 Raffaele Marcellino, music composer
 Jeni Mawter, children's author
 Andrew Orsatti, sports journalist
 Catriona Rowntree, television presenter
 David Smiedt, journalist, author and comedian 
 Paul Burns, radio journalist
 Patrick Staveley, sports and music journalist
 Paul Hemsley, magazine journalist
 Tara Rushton, sports presenter and journalist

Accreditation
Registered Higher Education Provider under Commonwealth legislation, regulated by the Tertiary Education Quality and Standards Agency (TEQSA) and listed on the National Register of Higher Education Providers.

Approved for FEE-HELP and a member of the Australian Council for Private Education and Training (ACPET) which includes the Australian Student Tuition Assurance Scheme (ASTAS), the largest Australian private sector scheme ensuring full protection for Macleay College students.

Approved education provider for international students (CRICOS provider 00899G).

Registered Training Organisation (RTO No 7096) under Commonwealth legislation, regulated by the Australian Skills Quality Authority (ASQA) and its qualifications listed on Training.gov.au, the official National Register of information on Training Packages, Qualifications, Courses, Units of Competency and Registered Training Organisations.

References

External links
 http://teqsa.gov.au/sites/default/files/auditreport_Macleay_2012.pdf

Australian tertiary institutions
Educational institutions established in 1988
Education in New South Wales
1988 establishments in Australia